Malirekus is a genus of springflies in the family Perlodidae. There are at least two described species in Malirekus.

Species
These two species belong to the genus Malirekus:
 Malirekus hastatus (Banks, 1920) (brook springfly)
 Malirekus iroquois Stark & Szczytko, 1988 (Iroquois springfly)

References

Further reading

 
 

Perlodidae
Articles created by Qbugbot